Archivolta is the Polish professional journal for architecture and construction  produced by Wydawnictwo Archivolta publishers in Kraków.

History and profile
Archivolta first appeared in 1999. The magazine is a Polish professional journal  for architects, construction engineers, conservation officers, building authorities and developers. The magazine is aimed at professional architects and other design professionals and enthusiasts with news, design, building technology, design tools, environment, and building culture sections. Archivolta is published on a quarterly basis.

References

External links
 www.archivolta.com.pl
 WorldCat

1999 establishments in Poland
Architecture magazines
Engineering magazines
Magazines established in 1999
Mass media in Kraków
Polish-language magazines
Professional and trade magazines
Quarterly magazines
Visual arts magazines published in Poland